Dystrichothorax is a genus of beetles in the family Carabidae, containing the following species:

 Dystrichothorax amplipennis Macleay, 1871
 Dystrichothorax angustimargo Baehr, 2004
 Dystrichothorax australis (Erichson, 1842)
 Dystrichothorax bernhardti Baehr, 2004
 Dystrichothorax bicolor Blackburn, 1892
 Dystrichothorax bipunctatus Blackburn, 1892
 Dystrichothorax catrionae Baehr, 2004
 Dystrichothorax convexicollis Baehr, 2004
 Dystrichothorax convexior Baehr, 2004
 Dystrichothorax corrugatus Baehr, 2004
 Dystrichothorax demarzi Baehr, 2004
 Dystrichothorax difficilis Baehr, 2004
 Dystrichothorax dilatatus (Erichson, 1842)
 Dystrichothorax eungellae Baehr, 2004
 Dystrichothorax gibbosus Baehr, 2004
 Dystrichothorax hamifer Baehr, 2004
 Dystrichothorax hawkeswoodi Baehr, 2004
 Dystrichothorax heatherae Baehr, 2004
 Dystrichothorax laevior Baehr, 2004
 Dystrichothorax laevipennis Baehr, 2004
 Dystrichothorax lamingtonensis Baehr, 2004
 Dystrichothorax leichardtensis Baehr, 2006
 Dystrichothorax lewisensis Baehr, 2004
 Dystrichothorax lividus Blackburn, 1892
 Dystrichothorax macrops Baehr, 2004
 Dystrichothorax montiscoerulei Baehr, 2006
 Dystrichothorax moorei Baehr, 2004
 Dystrichothorax multistriatus Baehr, 2004
 Dystrichothorax nothofagi Baehr, 2004
 Dystrichothorax novaeangliae Baehr, 2004
 Dystrichothorax otwayensis Baehr, 2004
 Dystrichothorax parallelocollis Baehr, 2004
 Dystrichothorax piceus Baehr, 2004
 Dystrichothorax pictus Baehr, 2004
 Dystrichothorax placidus Lea, 1908
 Dystrichothorax plagifer Baehr, 2004
 Dystrichothorax regularis Baehr, 2004
 Dystrichothorax reidi Baehr, 2004
 Dystrichothorax sloanei Blackburn, 1892
 Dystrichothorax storeyi Baehr, 2004
 Dystrichothorax tasmaniensis Baehr, 2004
 Dystrichothorax verticis Baehr, 2004
 Dystrichothorax vicinus Blackburn, 1892
 Dystrichothorax victoriae Baehr, 2004
 Dystrichothorax vittipennis Sloane, 1911
 Dystrichothorax windsorensis Baehr, 2004

References